Allium strictum is a Eurasian species of wild onion. Its native range extends from France to Yakutia.

Allium strictum produces one or two bulbs, each up to 8 mm in diameter. Scape is up to 80 cm tall. Leaves are flat, narrow, shorter than the scape, about 4 mm wide. Umbels are spherical with many flowers crowded together. Tepals are rose-pink or reddish-purple with a dark purple midvein. It grows on stony slopes and cliffs.

References

External links
USDA, ARS, Germplasm Resources Information Network. Allium strictum in the Germplasm Resources Information Network (GRIN), US Department of Agriculture Agricultural Research Service. Accessed on 2012-04-08.

strictum
Onions
Flora of Europe
Flora of temperate Asia
Plants described in 1809